Bulk email software is software that is used to send emails in large quantities.

Bulk email software usually refers to standalone software, while there are bulk email sending web-based services as well.

Computer worms that spread themselves via email are an example of bulk email software, sometimes referred to as a mass mailer. Such worms usually (but not necessarily) send spoofed "From" headers.

Types of software 
Most bulk email software programs are hosted by third party companies who sell access to their system. Customers pay per send or at a fixed monthly rate to have their own user account from which they can manage their contacts and send out email campaigns. Generally the advantage of this type of program is the reliability of the third party vendor and their application.
Some bulk email software programs are self-hosted. The customer buys a license or develops their own program and then hosts the program. Generally the advantage of this type of program is the lack of ongoing monthly fees to the owner/developer of the program. The disadvantage to using this option is that delivery rate is reduced as often users use one server to send bulk emails. There are various settings to tweak to avoid a server being labeled as spam.

References

Email